Emilio Bulgarelli (14 February 1917 – 2 February 1993) was an Italian water polo player who competed in the 1948 Summer Olympics. He was born in Reggio di Calabria and died in Naples. In 1948 he was a member of the Italian team which won the gold medal. He played all seven matches.

See also
 Italy men's Olympic water polo team records and statistics
 List of Olympic champions in men's water polo
 List of Olympic medalists in water polo (men)

References

External links
 
 

1917 births
1993 deaths
Sportspeople from Reggio Calabria
Italian male water polo players
Water polo players at the 1948 Summer Olympics
Olympic gold medalists for Italy in water polo
Medalists at the 1948 Summer Olympics
20th-century Italian people